Jahkeele Stanford Jack Marshall-Rutty (born June 16, 2004) is a Canadian professional soccer player who plays as a winger for Major League Soccer club Toronto FC.

Early life 
Marshall-Rutty began playing youth soccer with Brampton East SC when he was seven. He later moved to the Rush Canada Academy. He began playing for Toronto FC Academy in the USSDA in the 2016–2017 season, playing for the U13 team. He has since played for the U15, U16/17 and U18/19 teams as well.

Club career
Marshall-Rutty signed with Toronto FC II on December 17, 2018, becoming the youngest homegrown player to sign with the club. He made his professional debut for Toronto FC II in USL League One on June 28, 2019, coming on as an 86th minute substitute for Jordan Faria against Forward Madison FC.

Marshall-Rutty moved to Toronto FC's MLS side on January 22, 2020. He became the youngest player to sign a first-team contract with the club at age 15. He made his debut on October 24, coming on as a substitute for Alejandro Pozuelo against the Philadelphia Union, becoming the youngest player to ever play for the team. He was loaned to the second team for some matches in 2021. He scored his first goal for Toronto FC II, on June 19, against Fort Lauderdale CF.

International career 

Marshall-Rutty received his first international call-up to the Canada national under-15 team for the 2019 CONCACAF Boys' Under-15 Championship. 

In January 2021, he received his first call-up to the senior national team for a team camp, becoming the youngest player to ever be called up to the senior team, breaking the record of Alphonso Davies by five days.

Personal life
Born in Canada, Marshall-Rutty is of Jamaican, German, and Miꞌkmaq descent, with roots to the Membertou First Nation.

Career statistics

Club

References

External links 

 Toronto FC player profile
 
 

2004 births
Living people
Canadian soccer players
Canada men's youth international soccer players
Canadian people of First Nations descent
Canadian people of Jamaican descent
Canadian people of German descent
Mi'kmaq people
Toronto FC II players
USL League One players
Toronto FC players
Association football forwards
Homegrown Players (MLS)
Major League Soccer players
Soccer players from Brampton